Jesús Manuel Purizaga Sánchez (born 24 December 1959) is a retired Peruvian international footballer.

Playing career

Club
Born in Lima, Peru, Purizaga played for UT Cajamarca and for Lima giants Sporting Cristal and Alianza Lima.

International
Purizaga made 22 appearances for the Peru national football team from 1988 to 1991. He participated in the 1991 Copa América.

References

External links

1959 births
Living people
Footballers from Lima
Association football goalkeepers
Peruvian footballers
Peru international footballers
1989 Copa América players
1991 Copa América players
Peruvian Primera División players
Universidad Técnica de Cajamarca footballers
Sporting Cristal footballers
Club Alianza Lima footballers
Deportivo Municipal footballers
Juan Aurich footballers
Deportivo Pesquero footballers